Clear Creek Township is one of twelve townships in Huntington County, Indiana, United States. As of the 2010 census, its population was 1,928 and it contained 731 housing units.

History
Clear Creek Township was organized in 1838. It was named from Clear Creek, the largest stream within its borders.

Geography
The stream of Flint Creek runs through this township.

Unincorporated towns
 Goblesville

Adjacent townships
 Washington Township, Whitley County (north)
 Jefferson Township, Whitley County (northeast)
 Jackson Township (east)
 Union Township (southeast)
 Huntington Township (south)
 Dallas Township (southwest)
 Warren Township (west)
 Cleveland Township, Whitley County (northwest)

Major highways
  Indiana State Road 5
  Indiana State Road 9
  Indiana State Road 113
  Indiana State Road 114

References
 
 United States Census Bureau cartographic boundary files

External links
 Indiana Township Association
 United Township Association of Indiana

Townships in Huntington County, Indiana
Townships in Indiana
1838 establishments in Indiana
Populated places established in 1838